Abernethy v Mott, Hay and Anderson [1974] ICR 323 is a UK labour law case, concerning unfair dismissal.

Facts
Mr Abernethy, a civil engineer, claimed unfair dismissal under the Industrial Relations Act 1971 section 24 from his firm of 20 years, Mott, Hay and Anderson, after declining a secondment to work for the Greater London Council and then being told he was redundant. He was offered £850 in redundancy and £750 ex gratia. They argued he was either redundant or incapable of doing the work the employers wanted him to do.

The Tribunal held he was not redundant but the employers had shown he was incapable, and it was not unfair. The National Industrial Relations Court dismissed his appeal. Unwillingness to work related to capability.

Judgment
The Court of Appeal held the dismissal was fair, and the employer did not act unfairly by failing initially to give the principal reason to the employee for dismissal. Lord Denning MR said the following.

Cairns LJ held that although the employer was wrong to say he was redundant to begin with, it could reformulate the real reason for dismissal as a different one, and if that was fair it was good. An employer could give a false reason because he wished to not hurt the worker’s feelings, though he might later have trouble giving evidence that the real reason was fair, and it could make a breach of procedural fairness in not giving the worker the accurate charge. Alternatively there could be a mistake of language.

James LJ concurred.

Notes

United Kingdom labour case law
Court of Appeal (England and Wales) cases
1974 in British law
1974 in case law
Lord Denning cases